Patience is an English feminine given name referring to the virtue of patience. It was a name created by the Puritans in the 1600s. It has seen steady, though infrequent, usage in the United States throughout its history. The name has ranked among the top 1,000 names given to newborn girls in the United States since 1994, when it returned to the top 1,000 for the first time since 1894. In 2011, it was the 843rd most popular name given to newborn American girls.

People with the given name 

 Patience, of Patience and Prudence, a 1950s singing duo
 Patience Collier (1910–1987), British actress
 Patience Cowie (1964-2020), British geologist
 Patience Dabany (born 1941), singer from Gabon
 Patience Hodgson, member of Australian band The Grates
 Patience Worth (1883–1937), author Pearl Lenore Curran's claimed source of spirit guidance
 Patience McGraw

Notes

English feminine given names
Virtue names